"Love in an Elevator" is a song performed by American rock band Aerosmith, written by Steven Tyler and Joe Perry. It was released in August 1989 as the lead single from their third album with Geffen Records, Pump, released in September. It peaked at No. 5 on the Billboard Hot 100 and reached No. 1 on the Hot Mainstream Rock Tracks chart. The RIAA certified it gold.

Background
According to Tyler, the song was based on an actual experience where he was making out with a woman in an elevator and the doors opened.  Tyler said that “It felt like a lifetime waiting for those doors to close.”

Recording
"Love in an Elevator", like the other tracks on Pump, was recorded some time in April to June 1989 at Little Mountain Sound Studios in Vancouver, British Columbia. The song was produced by Bruce Fairbairn and was engineered by Mike Fraser with Ken Lomas as second engineer, and in addition to Aerosmith – Steven Tyler (lead vocals), Joe Perry (guitars, backing vocals), Brad Whitford (guitars, backing vocals), Tom Hamilton (electric bass, backing vocals), and Joey Kramer (drums, percussion) – were Bob Dowd (backing vocals), Bruce Fairbairn (backing vocals), and Catherine Epps (elevator operator).

Track listing

7" 45 RPM

CD single

Music video
The music video for "Love in an Elevator" was directed by Marty Callner. At the beginning of the video, Aerosmith are walking through a fancy department store. An elevator operator (played by former Playboy model Brandi Brandt) suggestively asks Tyler if he is "going down". Tyler leaps into the elevator before the band begins playing the song onstage (with several flash cuts to scenes in the department store).

Reception

Award nomination
The song received a Grammy Award nomination in 1990 for Best Hard Rock Performance, but lost out to Living Colour.

In concert
The song has consistently been a staple in the band's setlist on almost every tour they have performed since the song's release.  It is a fan favorite and is well known among mainstream audiences.

Also, in concert, Tyler often changes the lyrics to those that are more controversial and profanity-laden; on a version of the song featured on the live album A Little South of Sanity, culled from the band's tours in the 1990s, listeners can hear Tyler say "jackin' in the elevator" and "lick your funky ass" (or "fucking ass") instead of "kiss your sassafras".

Use in Disney World rollercoaster
A portion of the song plays within the ride sequence of Walt Disney World's Rock 'n Roller Coaster ride, which features different Aerosmith songs on each of its ride vehicles. The lyrics for the Disney World version were specially revised to say "love on a roller coaster" at the end of the ride.

Charts

Weekly charts

Year-End charts

Certifications

References

External links

Aerosmith songs
Albums with cover art by Mark Ryden
1989 singles
1989 songs
Elevators
Geffen Records singles
Glam metal songs
Funk metal songs
Music videos directed by Marty Callner
Song recordings produced by Bruce Fairbairn
Songs written by Joe Perry (musician)
Songs written by Steven Tyler